Kalyan Singh Thakur is an Indian politician and member of the Bharatiya Janata Party. Thakur was a member of the Madhya Pradesh Legislative Assembly from the Vidisha South constituency in Gwalior district.

References 

People from Vidisha
Bharatiya Janata Party politicians from Madhya Pradesh
Madhya Pradesh MLAs 2013–2018
Living people
Year of birth missing (living people)